Judge Strand may refer to:

Leonard T. Strand (born 1965), judge of the United States District Court for the Northern District of Iowa
Roger Gordon Strand (1934–2017), judge of the United States District Court for the District of Arizona